Dutch uncle is an informal term for a person who issues frank, harsh or severe comments and criticism to educate, encourage or admonish someone. Thus, a "Dutch uncle" is the reverse of what is normally thought of as avuncular or uncle-like (indulgent and permissive).

Origins

During the Anglo-Dutch Wars between England and the Netherlands in the 17th century, the English language gained an array of insults (including "Dutch uncle"), such as:

These terms also gained prominence in 17th-century New England during its rivalry with New Netherland, which the Dutch captured (and later recaptured) during the Second Anglo-Dutch War. 

These colorful (though now incongruous) phrases became part of English usage worldwide, and some are still in use today.

Alternative explanations
Another proposed explanation is that the term, often expressed as "talk to one like a Dutch uncle," originated in the early 19th century as an allusion to the sternness and sobriety attributed to the Dutch people. Dutch behaviour is defined in the book Culture Shock! Netherlands: A Survival Guide to Customs and Etiquette as "practical, direct, outspoken, stubborn, well-organised, blunt and thinking they are always right." According to that source, these are the alleged reasons behind the English term "Dutch uncle." Another book that advocates this theory is The UnDutchables, which assigns comparable characteristics to Dutch people: "not lacking in self-esteem...caught up in a cycle of endless envy...always speak their mind...frank, obstinate, blunt", basically summed up by the phrase "the natives thrive on shaking their fingers at and scolding each other."

Footnotes

References
Bolt, Rodney. The Xenophobe's Guide to the Dutch. 

English phrases
Anti-Dutch sentiment
Etymologies